Dendrite is a contact adhesive and rubber cement brand marketed in South Asia, mainly in Northeast India, Bangladesh and Bhutan.

Products
The adhesive is marketed in glue sticks, glue tubes and in cans. Dendrite holds 80% of the market share throughout the country in footwear retail market.

Its marketing slogan is Bonding our world together.

Production Company
Dendrite is produced by the Chandras' Chemical Enterprises (Pvt) Limited   under the umbrella of the P. C. Chandra Group based in Kolkata.

Chandras' Chemical Enterprises (Pvt) Limited is the second unit of the Group which was set up in 1965. The company has three factories in Kolkata. The company manufactures and markets a variety of Synthetic Adhesives based on Polychloroprene, Polyurethane, Epoxy, EVA, Lamination and other Elastomers. These products are mainly used in footwear, automobile, shipbuilding, railway coaches, engineering, electronics, leather goods, flooring, packaging, construction and household applications. The company's major product is marketed under the brand name 'DENDRITE'.

The products are marketed through an All-India network of dealers and through its several branches all over the country. The products are also exported to Middle East and SAARC countries.

External links
Official Website
Strong Adhesives

Adhesives